The 2010 Great West Conference men's basketball tournament took place March 10–13, 2010 in Orem, UT. This was the inaugural tournament for the league. Per NCAA regulations as a new Division I conference, the Great West champion did not receive an automatic bid into the NCAA tournament. However, the champion received an automatic bid to the 2010 CollegeInsider.com Tournament.

Format
All seven conference members qualified for the tournament with seeding based on standings from the regular season.

Bracket
* – Denotes overtime period

References

Great West Conference men's basketball tournament
2009–10 Great West Conference men's basketball season